West Market Street United Methodist Church (WMSUMC) is one of the oldest churches in Greensboro, North Carolina, and is over 190 years old; WMSUMC is located in downtown Greensboro across from the courthouse. It is a relatively large church with approximately 1700 members, though not all are active. The current sanctuary was constructed between 1893 and 1898; it was the third sanctuary built by the congregation. Today, the church has expanded, with a larger educational complex adjacent to the sanctuary, and other properties, including an Early Childhood Center, held at nearby. The Senior Pastor is the Reverend Beth Crissman, with Associate Pastor the Reverend Jeremy Benton.

History 

The congregation of West Market Street United Methodist Church dates back to a group of Methodists living in Greensboro and holding services at the Greensboro Male Academy on Sycamore Street in the 1820s, 12 years after the founding of Greensboro. Reverend Peter Doub, who had been recently assigned to the Guildford Circuit, encouraged this group of Methodists to build a church in 1830. The cornerstone for a sanctuary was laid on August 14, 1830, and by 1831, the building was completed. It was initially known as the Greensboro Methodist Episcopal Church and was the first church building in the small village of Greensboro. The congregation consisted of 64 members at this time, 46 of whom were white and 18 of whom were black.

In 1849, the Greensboro Methodist Episcopal Church decided to build a new sanctuary and a lot on West Market Street was purchased from the Greensboro Female College Trustees; this new church was completed in 1851 and the congregation was now approaching 200. In 1866, the names of all the church's black members disappeared from the official roll; it is believed that many of these former members joined St. Matthews, the first Methodist church organized for African Americans in Greensboro.

As the church grew, the congregation decided to organize several mission churches: one in southeast Greensboro in 1884 which became Centenary; a second in the Proximity mill village (1897), and a third near the new state college for women which became College Place (1899). Three others followed in the 20th century: Bethel (1911), Park Place (1920), and Christ (1956). The church program grew also, and new initiatives were a Woman's Foreign Missionary Society established in 1879 with 57 charter members and the first children's missionary society called "Busy Bees," organized by Mrs. Sidney Bumpass in 1880.    

In 1892, the congregation decided to build a third sanctuary in 1892, and the current sanctuary was completed in 1898 and dedicated in 1901, when the debt was fully paid. An adjacent Sunday school building was added in 1920.

In 1930, the congregation had reached 1,922 members and, to celebrate the church's centennial, it published a brief history and held special services. In 1932, the Park Place Methodist Episcopal Church, South, voted to merge with West Market Street, due to economic uncertainty during the Great Depression. 

In 1939, the Methodist Episcopal Church, the Methodist Protestant Church, and the Methodist Episcopal Church, South merged to form The Methodist Church. Then, in 1968,The Methodist Church and The Evangelical United Brethren Church merged to form The United Methodist Church, so the official name of the church changed to West Market Street United Methodist Church.

Services 

For many years, the church held three Sunday services: traditional services at 8:30 am and 11 am with a modern service at 9 am. Today, the church holds two services on Sundays: a traditional service in the Sanctuary at 11:00am and a modern service in the Fellowship Hall at 9:00am. It also hosts a variety of services that are linked to seasons in the church year. These include Advent and Christmas service and Lenten and Easter services.

Music 

Music for the traditional service is usually centered around the Dobson-Rosales pipe organ, but a grand piano, harpsicord and other traditional instruments are often used. The choir is a sizeable one, with around 20 regular participants.  

Music for the modern service, which is largely of the contemporary Christian genre, is performed by a band consisting of church members and professional musicians. Their instruments include drums, guitars, a bass and an electric piano.  

The children's choir is a large part of the church's music program, with performances being held during both the traditional and modern services. The church also hosts regular concert events ranging from jazz to classical music.

Outreach 

Outreach for West Market Street ranges from local to international work. Mission work locally is done in a variety of ways and places, by supporting Greensboro Urban Ministries, participating in Agents of Grace, building houses for Habitat for Humanity, and providing services to Washington Street Montessori School. This program has grown considerably in the past decades and has expanded to many new places. Global outreach at West Market has also grown with team from the church working in several countries, including Bulgaria, Costa Rica, Mexico, Africa, and Guatemala.

Youth 

Youth Ministry at West Market encompasses young adults in grades 6 through 12 is usually separated into a senior high group and a middle school group. Sunday school classes, youth groups, and mission teams engage students in different ways. Recent mission teams worked in West Virginia, Wilmington, NC and Nassau, Bahamas.

 Planning for the Future

Between 1998 and 2001, the congregation undertook an extensive renovation program to increase flexibility in the sanctuary, accessibility to all church areas, and visibility. It also constructed a new building for the Early Childhood Center, added a columbarium under the sanctuary, and redesigned the chapel. In 2014, it created a recreation area on the roof of the Education Building, similar to one there is the 1950s and 1960s, and in 2019 the Fellowship Hall was renovated to better accommodate the modern worship service.

Recognizing the need to constantly upgrade its facilities and to maintain a building listed on the National Register of Historic Places (1985), the congregation established the Legacy Fund Program to build an endowment for capital projects. To date, nearly $3 million has been pledged.

During the COVID pandemic, in-person church services were suspended (March 2020), but the staff reached out to offer electronic worship and educational alternatives. Today, Sunday services are held at West Market Street at 9 am and 11 am with Sunday school at 10 am; both continue to be offered electronically also.  

This congregation, organized in 1830, is looking forward to celebrating its bicentennial in 2030.

References

Add Faith on the Move: The History of West Market Street United Methodist Church by Gayle Hicks Fripp, 2013.

External links
Church website
Downtown Greensboro website

United Methodist churches in North Carolina
Churches in Greensboro, North Carolina
Churches on the National Register of Historic Places in North Carolina
Churches completed in 1893
19th-century Methodist church buildings in the United States
National Register of Historic Places in Guilford County, North Carolina